Founded in Toronto in 1988, the Loran Scholars Foundation is a national charitable organization awarding scholarships for students entering university in Canada. Loran Scholars receive the country's largest undergraduate merit award on the basis of character, commitment to service and leadership potential.

Loran Scholars

The Loran Scholars Foundation selects up to 36 students each year for an undergraduate scholarship valued at $100,000. It has been active since 1990.

The scholarship is tenable at 25 public universities throughout Canada; however, the lower level awards (provincial awards and finalist awards) can be used at any public Canadian university or college. Twenty-two Loran Scholars have gone on to win Rhodes Scholarships. It consists of annual stipends, a matching tuition waiver, summer internship funding, annual retreats and scholar gatherings, and mentoring over four years of study.

Candidate selection

The Loran Scholar selection process is rigorous. The selection process is as follows:

 Applications are open to all graduating students in high schools and cégeps across Canada and consist of a written application submitted electronically; the deadline is typically in early October. 
 In the 2022/23 Cycle 4,752 applications were received; those applications were shortlisted to a group of 581 candidates who were invited to submit a video to complement their written application. From there, 266 students were invited to semi-final interviews (both one-one-one and panel interviews) which took place online over the course of four weeks in 38 different regions across the country.
 Up to 88 finalists are invited from across Canada to attend two days of National Selections in Toronto.

 Up to 36 candidates are selected as Loran Scholars. In addition, up to 104 candidates are offered finalist ($5,000) and provincial/territorial ($2,000) awards.

Notable alumni
Since the award was established in 1990, the foundation has selected 615 Loran Scholars. Past Loran Scholars include Lucas Skoczkowski, founder and former CEO of Redknee; Graham Fox, president and CEO of the Institute for Research on Public Policy; Diane Nalini de Kerckhove,
a jazz musician and physicist; youth engagement leader and social justice advocate Michelle Dagnino; CPR assist device inventor Corey Centen; François Tanguay-Renaud, Director of York University's Jack & Mae Nathanson Centre on Transnational Human Rights, Crime and Security, and Associate Dean Research at Osgoode Hall Law School; Fédération des communautés Francophones et Acadienne du Canada (FCFA) executive director Alain Dupuis; Thalmic Labs co-founder and CEO Stephen Lake; and Orpyx CEO Breanne Everett.

In 2017, several Loran Scholars were recognized for their impact. Patrick Hickey received the Young Humanitarian Award from the Canadian Red Cross. Afzal Habib, co-founder of Kidogo, and Stephen Lake, co-founder and CEO of Thalmic Labs were on Forbes 30 Under 30 list. Amy Tan and Lauren Albrecht were featured on Avenue Magazine's Top 40 list, for Calgary  and Edmonton, respectively.

Awards

Several awards are granted by the foundation.

 $100,000 Loran Award. There are 36 available to be awarded in the 2022-2023 selection year.
 $5,000 Loran Finalist Award, offered to all qualified finalists who attend National Selections but are not selected as Loran Scholars. There are 54 available for 2022-2023.
 $2,000 Loran Provincial/Territorial Award, offered by semi-final committees to outstanding candidates who are not asked to attend national selections. There are 60 available.
 Honour Citation, granted to students who distinguish themselves at semi-final interviews but are not offered any monetary awards.
 Semi-Finalist Certificate, issued to students selected for a semi-final interview.

Criteria
Loran Scholars are selected on the basis of character, service, and leadership potential.

Financial value
Each Loran Scholar receives a scholarship valued at $100,000 over four years (assuming annual renewal during university). The award has three main financial components:

The Loran Scholars Foundation offers a $10,000 living stipend per annum.
The partner institution at which the scholar chooses to study grants a tuition waiver up to $10,000 per annum.
Scholars have access to up to $14,000 for three tri-sectoral summer internships.

Loran Scholars may study at the following universities in Canada:

Atlantic Canada:
Dalhousie University, Memorial University, Mount Allison University, University of King's College, University of New Brunswick.

Québec:
McGill University, Université Laval, Université de Montréal, Université de Sherbrooke.

Ontario:
McMaster University, Toronto Metropolitan University, Queen's University, University of Guelph, University of Ottawa, University of Toronto, University of Waterloo, Western University, York University.

Prairies:
University of Alberta, University of Calgary, University of Manitoba, University of Saskatchewan.

British Columbia:
Simon Fraser University, University of British Columbia, University of Victoria.

Experiential value
A unique aspect of the Loran Award is the mentorship program, where each Loran Scholar is paired with a mentor who is a business or community leader. Current and former mentors include ACE Bakery founder Martin Connell, OC, O.Ont; Canadian senator Hon. Landon Pearson; former Ontario Premier Bob Rae; social entrepreneur Scott Gilmore; Second Cup co-founder Frank O'Dea; Dr. Alice Chan-Yip, C.M. of the Montreal Children's Hospital; TV host Lindsay Cameron Wilson; and McMaster professor Dr. Gary Warner.

Furthermore, the Loran Scholars Foundation offers funding (up to $10,000) for three summer internships:

Enterprise Summer
Community Development Summer
Public Policy Summer

Summer employers have included the World Health Organization, the United Nations High Commissioner for Refugees, the Mãori Law Review, BMO Capital Markets, VIA Rail, McKinsey & Company, the Canadian Urban Institute, Frontier College, the Government of Ontario, the Government of Nunavut, Samaritan's Purse and several alumni-founded companies such as Redknee and Canopy Labs.

W. Garfield Weston Award

The Loran Scholars Foundation previously administered the W. Garfield Weston Award for outstanding college-bound students in Canada. Established in 1999 with the support of the W. Garfield Weston Foundation, it awarded up to 25 scholarships to entering college students, and up to 25 scholarships to upper-year college students. The foundation selected its final class of W. Garfield Weston Scholars in 2012.

See also
 Morehead-Cain Scholarship (oldest merit-based undergraduate scholarship in the United States)
 Canada Millennium Scholarship (Canadian equivalent of US National Merit Scholarship program, awarded to ~2000 students every year, now defunct)
 Schulich Leader Scholarships (Major Canadian scholarship program awarding 100 scholarships annually)

References

External links
 Loran Scholars Foundation
 Garfield Weston Awards program

Scholarships in Canada
Student financial aid